Assiminea ovata is a species of minute operculate snail, a marine gastropod mollusk or micromollusk in the family Assimineidae.

Distribution
This species occurs in the Indian Ocean off Mozambique and South Africa.

References

 Kilburn, R.N. & Rippey, E. (1982) Sea Shells of Southern Africa. Macmillan South Africa, Johannesburg, xi + 249 pp. page(s): 51

External links
  Branch, G.M. et al. (2002). Two Oceans. 5th impression. David Philip, Cate Town & Johannesburg

Assimineidae
Gastropods described in 1848
Taxa named by Christian Ferdinand Friedrich Krauss